Lee Jin-kwon (born 22 January 1991) is a South Korean actor and singer.  He is best known for his supporting roles in Untouchable Lawman, The Magician and Gangnam Blues.  Lee also appeared in the famous and popular school drama series, Who Are You: School 2015 as Jin Kwon.

Filmography

Television

Film

References

External links 
 

1991 births
Living people
People from Jeongeup
21st-century South Korean male actors
South Korean male models
South Korean male television actors
South Korean male film actors
South Korean male singers
South Korean pop singers